3rd Street/Convention Center is a light rail station in Charlotte, North Carolina. The elevated dual side platforms are a stop along the Lynx Blue Line in Uptown Charlotte.

Location
The station is located above 3rd Street and is accessible from Martin Luther King Jr Boulevard, via sidewalk and the Charlotte Rail Trail, and 3rd Street, via stairs and elevator. It is partially covered and adjacent to the Hilton Charlotte Uptown hotel, part of One Wells Fargo Center; and is also adjacent to 300 South Brevard, the Charlotte Convention Center, and the NASCAR Hall of Fame, catercorner at Brevard Street. Other nearby landmarks and popular destinations include: 200 South Tryon, 300 South Tryon, 400 South Tryon, BB&T Center, Bechtler Museum of Modern Art, Charlotte Plaza, Duke Energy Plaza, Johnston Building, Knight Theater, Latta Arcade, Overstreet Mall, Romare Bearden Park, The Green, Two Wells Fargo Center, Three Wells Fargo Center, and Truist Field.

History
The station, originally known as Convention Center, first opened for service on June 28, 2004, for the historic Charlotte Trolley and was located adjacent to the Charlotte Convention Center. Originally with one track active and one platform, it operating for little over 19 months, before closing on February 6, 2006.  When the station was reopened in November 24, 2007, it was grouped together with the newly constructed 3rd Street platforms for the LYNX Blue Line and was rechristened collectively as the 3rd Street/Convention Center. Regular service with fare collection commenced on Monday, November 26, 2007.  Charlotte Trolley service resumed on April 20, 2008, but was scaled back to weekend and special events in 2009.  In 2010, the Charlotte Trolley service was discontinued, leaving the Convention Center platform abandoned.

Station layout 
The station consists of two main side platforms, both of which includes a low-level area for heritage streetcars, and is partially covered by the Hilton Charlotte Uptown hotel; other amenities include ticket vending machines, emergency call box, and bicycle racks. A third unused side platform, located adjacent to the Charlotte Convention Center, is for trainspotting and gathering. The station also features several art installations, with its most notable entitled Light Station, by Jody Pinto. The display encompasses 20 illuminated fiberglass canopies that also serve as shelter for users during inclement weather. Also included is a drinking fountain basin designed to look like dogwood, the North Carolina state flower, by Nancy Blum. Bas-reliefs entitled Gingko, by Alice Adams; and track fencing featuring dogwood leaves, by Shaun Cassidy.

References

External links
 
 Charlotte Center City
 Uptown Charlotte

3rd Street/Convention Center
3rd Street/Convention Center
Railway stations in the United States opened in 2004
2004 establishments in North Carolina